David Ward, (born 14 January 1957) commonly known as Dave "Squatch" Ward or David "Squatch" Ward, is a Scottish-born Canadian voice actor who has played roles in television and movies. His most popular starring roles have been on Dragon Ball, Aldo in Sitting Ducks, Gundam Wing, and the live-action role of Ned Bell in So Weird.

Early life
David Ward was born in Glasgow, Scotland. He moved to Canada with his family at the age of 3.

After doing most schooling in Toronto, Ward became a carpenter and moved out west. Eventually, he joined the hotel business and later becoming the owner of his own hotel.

Career
Ward got started in the entertainment business by becoming a stand-up comedian and performed in comedy clubs. His time came one night when a popular act failed to show and he was the only one to perform in front of a full audience, becoming a success. Three months later he quit his business and went on a comedy tour for 4 years.
 
Around the early 1990s, he was approached by a talent agent who encouraged him to audition for television shows and movies shot in Vancouver. This landed him in numerous films and shows. Ward has also played roles in animated films in television, including anime.

Personal life
Ward is married to his wife Lisa. He is currently active on YouTube and Facebook.

Filmography

Animation
 Action Man – Additional Voices
 Being Ian – Male Nurse
 Firehouse Tales – Stinky Bins
 Gadget & the Gadgetinis – Additional Voices
 Krypto the Superdog – Big Bad Wolf, Jackhammer Man, Mike
 Martha Speaks – Bob's owner
 Pucca – Muji
 Ricky Sprocket: Showbiz Boy – Additional Voices
 Sitting Ducks – Aldo
 The Adventures of Snowden the Snowman – Einstein / Mr. Bear
 What About Mimi? – Additional Voices
 Yakkity Yak – Chuck Damage
 Yvon of the Yukon – Killer Kolofski

Anime
 Dragon Ball – Ox-King / Rabbit Gang Member
 Dragon Ball Z – Ox-King
 Dragon Ball Z: Dead Zone – Ox-King
 Inuyasha – Kyokotsu
 Mobile Suit Gundam Wing – Master Long / Doctor J
 Hamtaro – Elder Ham
 MegaMan NT Warrior – NoodleMan / PlanetMan
 Tayo the Little Bus – Chris
 Transformers: Cybertron – Leobreaker

Live-action
 The Commish – Freddy
 Earthsea – Dunain
 Hawkeye – Sam
 So Weird – Ned Bell
 It's a Very Merry Muppet Christmas Movie – Sally Ann Santa
 Wyvern – Fisherman
 Alice – Walrus
 Ultraman Tiga – Ultraman Tiga (voice)

References

External links
 
 
 Dave Ward's official blog on Blogspot
 Dave Ward at Voice Chasers

1957 births
Living people
Canadian male voice actors
Male actors from Glasgow
Male actors from Vancouver
Scottish emigrants to Canada
Scottish male voice actors